The 2019–20 Gibraltar National League season is the first season of the new Gibraltar National League in Gibraltar, and the 121st season of football on the territory overall. The league was announced in June 2018 when the Gibraltar Football Association decided to merge the Gibraltar Premier Division and Gibraltar Second Division at the conclusion of the 2018–19 season.

On 1 August 2019, it was confirmed that the league would be contested by 16 teams. Eleven days later, the GFA revealed that two teams had withdrawn and the league would be contested by 14 teams. That number was reduced to 13 the following day when Leo also withdrew from the league.

In light of the COVID-19 pandemic, the season was suspended in March 2020. The Challenge Group was abandoned, while the Gibraltar FA looked to conclude the Championship Group in some form. On 1 May 2020, the Gibraltar Football Association announced that the domestic football season had been terminated. After the league had discussions of whether the title would be awarded, the Gibraltar FA announced on 7 May 2020 the season was declared null and void and the title would remain vacant.

Format
On 1 August 2019, the GFA confirmed details of the restructure of domestic football in Gibraltar, and the format of the new 16 team league. By 12 August, the GFA confirmed two teams would not participate and 14 teams would contest the league. With Leo's withdrawal the next day, the league was reduced to 13. Teams will play one round of games as a single league, before splitting into two groups: the Championship Group contested by the top 7 sides, and the Challenge Group between the bottom 6 sides. The winners of the Challenge Group will receive the GFA Challenge Trophy and receive a bye to the second round of the next season's Rock Cup.

Teams

16 teams were initially expected to participate in the inaugural National League, with Hound Dogs dropping down to the 2019–20 Gibraltar Intermediate League, having been granted special dispensation by the GFA.

On 9 August, Gibraltar Phoenix withdrew from the league. Two days before, Gibraltar United were threatened with expulsion if they failed to repay debts by 12 August.

On 12 August, the GFA confirmed the withdrawal of Gibraltar Phoenix and Gibraltar United. The day after, Leo withdrew from the league too, after a takeover by King's Lynn Town owner Stephen Cleeve was blocked by the GFA. On 22 August, it was reported that Olympique 13 were at risk of withdrawing from the league, having forfeited their game against Europa due to a shortage of players. They were expelled on 11 September.

Teams with a blue background played in the 2018–19 Gibraltar Premier Division. Teams with a red background played in the 2018–19 Gibraltar Second Division.

Note: Flags indicate national team as has been defined under FIFA eligibility rules. Players may hold more than one non-FIFA nationality.

Managerial changes

League table

Results

Season statistics

Scoring

Top scorers

Hat-tricks

Clean Sheets

Awards

Player of the week

Monthly awards

End-of-season awards
End of season awards were handed out by Football Gibraltar, the Gibraltar Football Association's official UEFA correspondents, on 28 May and 2 June 2020.

Fans' Team of the Season

References

External links
Gibraltar Football Association
Gibraltar Football Association–Championship Group
Gibraltar Football Association–Challenge Group

Gibraltar National League seasons
Gib
1
Gibraltar